Guzy is a surname. Notable people with the surname include:

Carol Guzy (born 1956), American photographer
Jarosław Guzy (born 1955), Polish politician and businessman
Michaela Guzy, American media executive, entrepreneur, and on-air show host
Stefan Guzy (born 1980), German poster artist